Hal Clarendon (1876–1959) was an actor and director in the United States. He had a namesake stock theater company. He appeared in theatrical shows including as a lead. He was slated to direct The Other Man starring Hobart Henley and Irene Hunt. He was general director of the new Ruth J. MacTammany Motion Picture Company in 1916.

Filmography
Leah Kleschna (film) (1913), as Kleschna
The Port of Doom (1913)
A Lady of Quality (1913 film)
The Redemption of David Corson (1914), as Andy MacFarlane
Marta of the Lowlands (1914)
His Last Dollar (1914)
The Conspiracy (1914 film)
The Little Gray Lady (1914), as Sam Meade
The Terror of Anger (1914)
The Scales of Justice (film) (1914), as Walter Elliott
One of Our Girls (1914), as Comte Florian de Crebellon 
The Day of Days (film) (1914), as B. Penfield / Hajji, the beggar
A Woman's Triumph (1914), as Georgie Robertson 
An American Citizen (1914)
A Virgin Paradise (1921), as John Latham
The Pride of Jennico (film) (1914), as Prince Eugen
David Harum (1915), as Chet Timson
I SCREAM (1934)
 Alma, Where Do You Live? (1917), director, adapted from a play
One Day (1916 film), Prince Ronneaus, and as director
The Corsican Brothers (1915), as Chateau Renard
The Actor and the Rube (1915)
Who Got Stung? (1915), as Jim
Across the Way (1915), as Caretaker
The Conspiracy (1914), as Morton

References

External links
Hal Clarendon on IMDb

1876 births
1959 deaths
20th-century American male actors